WNYT may refer to:

WNYT (TV), a television station (channel 13 virtual/12 digital) licensed to Albany, New York, United States
WNYT (internet radio), an internet radio station at the New York Institute of Technology